Frida Lina Marianne Sandén (born May 20, 1994) is a Swedish singer who represented Sweden in the Junior Eurovision Song Contest 2007 where she placed eighth. During 2008 and 2009 Frida has participated with a role in the musical Hujeda mej vá många sånger alongside her sister Mimmi and Hanna Hedlund amongst others.

As a student Sandén attended the Adolf Fredrik's Music School in Stockholm. She is the sister of Molly Sandén who represented Sweden in the Junior Eurovision Song Contest 2006 and Mimmi Sandén who represented Sweden in the Junior Eurovision Song Contest 2009. Frida was also in the choir behind her sister Molly when she performed in the Junior Eurovision Song Contest 2006.

In 2012, Frida Sandén participated in X Factor Sweden which was broadcast on TV4. She went on to the finals, where she was outvoted on October 19 and ended up 10th.

References

External links
 Official website
 Frida Sandén on Myspace

1994 births
Junior Eurovision Song Contest entrants
Swedish pop singers
Living people
21st-century Swedish singers
21st-century Swedish women singers